This is a list of bridges in the city of Ankara, Turkey.

Historic bridges

Notes 

Ankara-related lists
 
Bridges, Ankara
Turkey transport-related lists
Ankara